Shah Abdul Hannan (23 September 1939 – 2 June 2021) was a Bangladeshi Islamic philosopher, writer, economist, educator and media personality. He served as the deputy governor of the Bangladesh Bank and chairman of the National Board of Revenue. He was the founder vice chancellor of Darul Ihsan University, North South University, chairman of Islamic Economics Research Bureau and the director of Islami Bank Bangladesh Ltd.

Early life and education
Shah Abdul Hannan was born in 1939 in Mymensingh, Bangladesh. He completed Bachelor of Economics and Political Science in 1959 and Master of Political Science in 1961 from University of Dhaka.  After successfully completing studentship he joined the then Pakistan Civil Service.

Career

Government service
Shah Abdul Hannan started his professional life as a lecturer of political science in a college in Dhaka. He joined Pakistan Finance Service in 1963 and retired as the secretary of the Govt. of Bangladesh in 1998. He served the Government of Bangladesh as:
 Chairman, National Board of Revenue, where he pioneered the introduction of VAT (Value Added Tax) in Bangladesh;
 Deputy Governor of Bangladesh Bank;
 Director General, Bureau of Anti-corruption;
 Secretary, Ministry of Social Welfare;
 Secretary, Internal Resources Division, Ministry of Finance.

Educator
Hannan was one of the founding members of the North South University, Asian University of Bangladesh and Darul Ihsan University. He also served as the chairman of the Institute of Research and Development (IRD), International Islamic University, Chittagong and syndicate member of Manarat International University.

He has lectured for YouTube videos and indoor classes on a wide range of issues including women's rights, human rights, contemporary issues and Islamic solutions, Usul al fiqh and Islamic economics.

Economist
As an economist Shah Abdul Hannan served as:
 Co-founder, Islamic Economics Research Bureau
 Co-founder, Bangladesh Institute of Islamic Thought
 Member, Editorial Board, The Daily Arthanitee
 Chief Advisor, Islamic Insurance Co. Bangladesh
 Chairman, Islamic Banks’ Consultative Forum (IBCF)
 Founder member, Central Shariah Board of Islamic Banks
 Chairman of Islami Bank Bangladesh Ltd

Social work
 Chairman, Ibn Sina Trust
 Chairman, Manarat Dhaka International School and College
 Member, Association of Correction and Social Reclamation, Bangladesh (ACSRB)

Media personality
Shah Hannan regularly attended media programs in channels NTV, ATN Bangla, RTV and Islamic TV.

Works
Books written by Shah Abdul Hannan:
 Islami Ortthonitite Shorker er Vumika (1985)
 Islami Orthoniti: Dorshon O Kormokoushol (2002)
 Nari Shomossa o Islam (1988)
 Nari O Bastobota (2002)
 Social Laws of Islam (1995)
 Desh Shomaj O Rajniti (2003)
 Bishoy Chinta
 Soviet Union e Islam (1976)
 Usul-al-Fiqh (2000)
 Law Economics and history (2003)
 Islam and Gender: The Bangladesh Perspective (2016)

Personal life
He had two children, Samina Akhter and Shah Mustafa Faisal.

Death
He died at Ibn Sina Hospital in the capital on Wednesday, 2 June 2021 at around 10:30 am at the age of 82.Shah Abdul Hannan passes away He has been undergoing treatment at the hospital since 8 May for geriatric illness. During this time he suffered multiple heart attacks. At the same time, he lost his memory due to inflammation in the brain.Former secretary Shah Abdul Hannan passes away His first Namaz-e-Janaza was held at Dhanmondi Eidgah Mosque ground after Zuhr. The second Janaza was held in front of his house at Sepahibagh at 3:30 pm. Then the third Janaza is held at the National Mosque Baitul Mukarram after Asr.Former secretary Shah Abdul Hannan passes away After three Janazas, he was buried at Shahjahanpur Cemetery in the capital.Former secretary Shah Abdul Hannan passes away

References

External links
 
Md. Mahmudul Hasan (2021) "Shah Abdul Hannan: An exemplary human being and teacher". Islamic Horizon, 50 (5). p. 61. . url: Islamic Horizons September/October 2021 by Islamic Society of North America - Issuu
Md. Mahmudul Hasan (2021) "Remembering my teacher Shah Abdul Hannan". The Daily Star, Dhaka, 5 July 2021. p. 9. url: Remembering my teacher Shah Abdul Hannan
Md. Mahmudul Hasan (2021) "In memory of Shah Abdul Hannan". New Age, 8 June 2021. url: In memory of Shah Abdul Hannan

1939 births
2021 deaths
People from Mymensingh District
Bangladeshi economists